Andrei Sazontov (1894 – August 26, 1938) was a Soviet komkor (corps commander). He fought for the Imperial Russian Army during World War I before going over to the Bolsheviks. He was a recipient of the Order of the Red Banner (twice) and the Order of the Red Star. During the Great Purge, he was arrested on May 26, 1938, and executed three months later at Kommunarka.

References

1894 births
1938 deaths
Russian military personnel of World War I
Soviet komkors
Recipients of the Order of the Red Banner
Great Purge victims from Russia
People executed by the Soviet Union
Soviet military personnel of the Russian Civil War
Frunze Military Academy alumni